S75 is a line on the Berlin S-Bahn. It operates from Wartenberg to Warschauer Straße over:
a section of the Outer ring, completed in the early 1940s as part of the Outer freight ring,
the Prussian Eastern line, opened on 1 October 1866 and electrified on 6 November 1928,

References

Berlin S-Bahn lines

fi:S75 (Berliinin S-Bahn)